Canadian Australians refers to Australians who identify as being of Canadian descent. It may also refer to Canadian immigrants and expatriates residing in Australia. According to statistics from 2006, there were as many as 21,000 Australians who have Canadian ancestors. Many Canadian Australians have immigrated from mainland Canada, as well as from the United States of America and from the United Kingdom. According to the 2016 Australian Census, there were 43,049 Canadian born Australians in Australia in 2016, which is an increase from 38,871 persons according to the 2011 Australian Census. The number of immigrants stem from both countries being former British colonies and both being parliamentary democracies in the Westminster tradition (Collins, 2015).

History

The first Canadian Australians were immigrants from both upper (now Ontario) and lower (now Quebec) mainland Canada who came to New South Wales and Tasmania because they were in exile during the 1837-38 Canadian civil war (High Commission of Canada, 2011). There were 154 prisoners that were sent to Australia (High Commission of Canada, 2011). Fifty eight of those were French Canadians that were sent to New South Wales without speaking English(High Commission of Canada, 2011). Of the convicts that settled in New South Wales, all were initially assigned as labourers and eventually allowed to be free settlers. These workers helped to build the foundation of Sydney's infrastructure that we still have today including Parramatta Road, Canada Bay, Exile Bay and a monument in Cabarita Park in Concord (High Commission of Canada, 2011).

The second wave of Canadian Australians came in 1851 in search of gold (Museums Victoria, 2017). The Australian Gold Rush saw people from around the world flock to Australia in search of gold, which included hundreds of Canadians (Museums Victoria, 2017). They made an impact in the popular town of Ballarat, where the ‘Canadian Gully’ was the name given to a gully after a Canadian gold miner found success and a large gold nugget was also named ‘The Canadian’ (Museums Victoria, 2017).

Canadian Australians helped to develop the foundations of modern-day Australian society in the years during and after the gold rush. In 1854 Samuel McGowan created Australia's first telegraph line which stretched from Melbourne to Williamstown (Museums Victoria, 2017). Around the same time, George and William Chaffe made multiple irrigation schemes throughout the Murray River (Museums Victoria, 2017). This allowed for water to be transported further away than before, which led to greater farming success and eventually the beginning of the dried fruit industry in South Australia and Victoria.

Australian-Canadian similar experiences during WWI 

On the 4th of August in 1914 Great Britain declared war on Germany. Both Canada and Australia's prime ministers accepted that their armies would join the imperial armies due to Australia and Canada being British Dominions at the time. Canada's opposition leader, Wilfrid Laurier said that Canada was “Ready, aye, Ready” in relation to Canada going to war and Australia's then opposition leader and later prime minister, Andrew Fisher, similarly commented that Australia was committed ‘to the last man and the last shilling’ (Australian National University, 2017)

There were many similarities of Australians and Canadians during World War 1. The Australian 1st Division was initially commanded by Canadian-educated Major-General Sir William Throsby Bridges. In 1915 the Canadian army was grouped together in divisions which followed the precedent of the ANZAC (Australian and New Zealand Army Corps). Canadian and Australian soldiers also fought side by side on the western front (Australian National University, 2017). Australians and Canadians fought together again in Passchendaele in late 1917 and launched the final allied offensives of 1918 in the east of Amiens which involved a spearhead of Australian soldiers and another of Canadian soldiers (Australian National University, 2017).

The Canadian and Australian governs called for an Imperial War cabinet in 1918 where the two prime ministers both represented their wounded and dead soldiers. Because Canada and Australia together played a pivotal role in the war, they had gained global influence which was recognised by the British government. This led to the two prime ministers both representing separate dominions at the Paris Peace Conference in 1919 and 1920 (Australian National University, 2017). While there was no constitutional changes during World War 1, the Imperial War Cabinet lead to a change of attitude that led to the granting of de jure independence for both countries in the Statute of Westminster in 1931 (Australian National University, 2017). This heightened sense of national identity that emerged in both Canada and Australia led to a third wave of Canadian immigrants into Australia. To show how paralleled Australia and Canada's World War 1 experiences were, these following statistics are given as a global rank and are according to NationMaster.com. In terms of allied mobilised personnel in World War 1 , Canada is 10th with 628,934 and Australia is 11th with 412,953. Furthermore, In terms of allied wounded in action in World War 1, Australia is 6th with 152,171 persons and Canada is 7th with 149,732 persons. Finally, in terms of deaths as a percentages of population, Australia is 11th with 1.38% of total population at the time and Canada is 12th with 0.92% of total population at the time.

Canadian Australian Programs and Clubs

After the second world war, the ‘skilled migration program’ developed by the Australian government allowed more Canadian immigrants to come to Australia if they had tertiary skills. This increased the number of Canadian Australians that immigrated to Australia and was also responsible for a general increase in immigration in Australia especially from Europe and North America.

New South Wales

Network Canada (Canadian Australian Network of Young Professionals)

Website: www.networkcanada.com.au

Network Canada is a professional & social networking group based in Sydney which is also known as the Canadian Australian Network of Young Professionals. It is the largest network of North American young professionals living in Australia. They provide travel advice around Australia and advice for living in Australia. Network Canada was started in 2002 as a social network for Canadian expats that lived in Sydney. Network Canada includes students and professionals from all continents and their hosted parties are sponsored by companies such as Canadian Club, Destination Canada and Hungry Jacks. The objective of Network Canada is for people to meet and network. In addition to events, Network Canada helps Canadian Australians settle into Sydney life by providing advice for different types of visas, immigration questions and general tips for a new Canadian Australian looking to live in Sydney.

Victoria

Canada Club of Victoria Inc.

Website: Canada Club of Victoria Inc.

The Canada Club of Victoria (CCV) has been running since its origins in 1940 and involves Canadian Australians from Melbourne and Regional Victoria. The Canadian Women's Club of Victoria was created in 1940, with the goal of helping Canadian women in Melbourne who were struggling with missing Canada as well as struggling with their husband's being away at war.  Around this time, the Canadian Men's Club was formed with a business and network focused objective between Australian and Canada. In 1981, these two clubs joined together  to create the present Canada Club of Victoria.

The CCV is a volunteer run social club for Canadian Australians or individuals with strong family ties to Canada. Their objective is to integrate Canadian and Australian culture through running events. The CCV host two main events each year which are Canada Day on the first of July and Thanksgiving on November 26th. They also run a number of smaller social events for people to network and talk about Canada related topics.

Online stores for Canadian Australians

OCanada

OCanada is an online store based in the Sunshine Coast Queensland which sells food and general products all related to Canada. They order shipments from Canada of popular foods, beverages, clothing, souvenirs and recipes. They allow their customers to make requests and offers for products that they currently do not provide to allow for changes in Canadian popular culture. They also have running specials and accept afterpay.

The Canadian Way

The Canadian Way is a Canadian product store which is based in Hurstville, Sydney but is also online. Notably, they sell family owned Jakemans 100% Pure and Organic Maple Syrup and 100% wild caught seafood which is caught in Canada and shipped directly to Australia where it is afterwards given to their retail partners or directly to people's houses.

The Canadian Way was started by a Canadian Australian, David Cost-Chretien. He spoke with many other Canadian Australians and started The Canadian Way after realising that there was a lot of demand for Canadian-based food in Australia. They sell lots of maple based products such as Maple syrup, Maple cookies and Maple Candy. They also sell a variety of Seafood such as Salmon and Caviar as well as popular unique Canadian food such as Motts Clamato Juice, Bits 'n Bites, Kraft Dinner and Triscuits.

Cultural Events

Today, Canadian Australians still celebrate Canadian cultural events such as Canada Day (July 1) and Canadian Thanksgiving (the second Monday of October). Organisations such as the Canada Club help these traditional events to live on.

Demographics

Religion

According to the 2016 Australian Census and compared to the 2011 Australian Census, Canadian Australians that were born in Canada have had a decline in religious affiliation. In 2011, 36.7% fit within the census category of “No Religion”  whereas in 2016, 45.3% identified as having “No Religion”. The most common religion was Catholic in both 2011 and 2016 with 20% and 17.1% of Canadian born Australians identifying as Catholic in those years respectively. These changes in religion demography follow a similar trend with all Australian born Australians and non-Australian born Australians respectively (24.5% & 20.2% Non-Religious in 2011 compared to 33.3% & 26.7% in 2016) (ABS, 2016)

Education

In 2016, 20.6% of Canadian born Australians aged 15 or over had a bachelor's degree or above as their highest educational achievement compared to 22% of Australian born Australians. Following a similar trend, 14.2% of Canadian born Australians had completed year 12 as their highest educational achievement compared to 15.7% of Australian born Australians. The decreased educational achievement is only slight but is consistent throughout other education matrices. Canadian born Australians had the following percentages as their highest education level; 8.8% had completed up to year 10 and 8.4% had completed up to year 9 or below. This can be compared to Australian born Australians where 10.8% had completed up to year 10 and 8% had completed up to year 9 or below as their highest education level. (ABS, 2016)

The education levels of Canadian Australian families as seen by the figures (ABS, 2016) above are quite similar. This may be because both Canada and Australia use standardised tests throughout primary and secondary school and similar tests are used for university admission. However, Canadian born Australians have a slightly decreased level of education and it was found in Canada that “in schools with a high number of students who are visible minorities and English language learners, the effects of standardized testing include a range of practices that reinforce inequity and increase social disparity”(Spencer, Delhi, & Ryan, 2012). Although this may also be apparent in some Australian schools, this could explain the slightly lower education levels of Canadian born Australians.

Economics

In 2016 the median weekly income for Canadian born Australians was $645 (personal), $1,570 (family) and $1,290 (household). This is slightly less than the figures for Australian born Australians, who had a median weekly income of $662 (personal), $1,734 (family) and $1,438 (household). This trend can potentially be explained by the lack of opportunity for post-education training that workers in Canada are given by their employers. “Canada is categorized by the OECD as one of the “weak” countries for training and since it tends to be categorized as average or above for public support, this suggests that employer support is exceedingly weak by international standards. This has led to comments that Canadian employers lack a training culture”(Benjamin, 2001).

Notable Canadian Australians

 Jack Cowin - fast food magnate
 Malcolm Fraser - 22nd Prime Minister of Australia
 Charles Ross - created eureka stockade flag design
 Samuel Mcgowan - first telephone line from Melbourne to Williamstown
 George and William Chaffey - irrigation systems in the Murray River
 Gordon Young - Director of Education in New South Wales who first introduced Softball in New South Wales.
 Derek Muller - Science Communicator
 Henry Ross - Gold miner and rebel at the Eureka Rebellion 
 Andrew McGrath- AFL Essendon - midfielder
 Jaeman Salmon - Rugby League Player
 Matt Dunning - Rugby Union Player
 Casey Dunning - Rugby Union Player

Bibliography

Australian vs Canada Conflict Stats Compared. (n.d.). Retrieved November 10, 2020, from https://www.nationmaster.com/country-info/compare/Australia/Canada/Conflict

Berry, A. (2001). Minimum Wages in Canada. Labor Market Policies in Canada and Latin America: Challenges of the New Millennium, 187-220. doi:10.1007/978-1-4757-3347-1_8

Betcha, B. (2014). About the club. Retrieved November 19, 2020, from http://www.canadianaustralianclub.com/abouttheclub

Bureau of Statistics . Australian Bureau of Statistics, Australian Government, 2016, www.abs.gov.au/.

Canada, Global Affairs. “History of Canada-Australia Relations.” GAC, High Commission of Canada, 17 Nov. 2011, www.canadainternational.gc.ca/australia-australie/bilateral_relations_bilaterales/history-histoire.aspx?lang=eng.

Clarke, Andrew, and Mikal Skuterud. “Why Do Immigrant Workers in Australia Perform Better than Those in Canada? Is It the Immigrants or Their Labour Markets?” 14 Nov. 2013, Canadian Journal of Economics/Revue Canadienne D'économique, vol. 46, doi:10.1111/caje.12059.

Collins, Emmet. “Alternative Routes: Intergovernmental Relations in Canada and Australia.” Canadian Public Administration, vol. 58, no. 4, 2015, pp. 591–604., doi:10.1111/capa.12147.

Richardson, Sue & Lester, Laurence. (2004). A Comparison of Australian and Canadian Immigration Policies and Labour Market Outcomes. Retrieved from https://www.researchgate.net/publication/252056325_A_Comparison_of_Australian_and_Canadian_Immigration_Policies_and_Labour_Market_Outcomes.

Sam, Erin. (2020). Bringing Canada Down Under. Retrieved November 19, 2020, from https://ocanada.com.au/

Spencer, B. L., Delhi, K., & Ryan, J. (2012). Canadian Education. Canadian Education, Chapter 8, 132-140. doi:10.1007/978-94-6091-861-2_1

Strategic Communication, P. (2017, June 8). Australian-Canadian parallel experiences during WWI. Retrieved November 19, 2020, from https://www.anu.edu.au/news/all-news/australian-canadian-parallel-experiences-during-wwi

Victoria, Museums. “Canada.” Origins.museumvictoria.com.au, Creative Victoria, 2017, origins.museumsvictoria.com.au/countries/canada.

www.networkcanada.com.au, N. (2015). Network Canada: Sydney Australia. Retrieved November 19, 2020, from http://www.networkcanada.com.au/

See also

 Anglo-Celtic Australians
 Asian Australians
 Australian Canadians
 Australia–Canada relations
 Caldoche
 Canadian New Zealanders
 European Australians
 Europeans in Oceania
 French Australians
 Immigration to Australia

References

 
 
Ethnic groups in Australia
Immigration to Australia
Australia